Flagship Food Group is a global,  diversified food company serving some retail, grocery, food service, and food-related organizations.

History 

Flagship Food Group was founded in January 2005 and is the result of a number of businesses and brands brought together to form a diversified food platform company.  Starting in 2013 the company has been increasing acquisitions, including Atlantic Foods Group, Treasure Valley Specialty Foods (the makers of the 505 Southwestern line of salsa and chile sauce products), and most recently Excelline Foods, makers of frozen and refrigerated Hispanic food products.  In cooperation with local and state governments, the production manufacturing operations of 505 Southwestern are being moved into a new  80,000 square foot facility outside of Albuquerque, NM. In February 2023, Flagship Food Group announced it had acquired the Santa Maria-based Curation Foods subsidiary, guacamole and dip producer Yucatan Foods, for an undisclosed sum.

References 

American companies established in 2005
Food and drink companies of the United States
Food and drink companies established in 2005